New York Life Investments is a U.S. investment management company based in Jersey City, New Jersey. New York Life Investments is a service mark and trade name of New York Life Investment Management LLC.  Founded in 1986, New York Life Investment's parent company is New York Life Insurance Company, the largest mutual life-insurance company in the United States, and one of the largest life insurers in the world, ranking #69 on the 2018 Fortune 500 list.

New York Life Investments offers investors access to institutional money management through its mutual funds, exchange-traded funds (ETFs), separately managed accounts, and non-traditional strategies. New York Life Investments has over $561 billion USD in assets under management.

History
Founded in 1986, New York Life Investments provides investment advisory services to financial advisors and their clients. An independent subsidiary of New York Life Insurance Company, over the years New York Life Investments has added to its boutique of investment advisors. This includes MacKay Shields (acquired by New York Life in 1984), Markston International, LLC (1999), New York Life Fixed Income Advisors (2004), Winslow Capital Management (2005), Epoch Investment Partners (2006), MacKay Municipal Managers (2009), Cornerstone Capital Management (2013), Cushing Asset Management (2014), and IndexIQ (2015).

References

External links
 IndexIQ ETFs
 MainStay Funds
 Investment Insights

Investment management companies of the United States
American companies established in 1986
Financial services companies established in 1986
1986 establishments in New Jersey